Lake Zamkaft is the ocean of light that Islamic prophet Muhammad is said to have flown over while on the Barak, during the Isra and Mi'raj (Arabic: الإسراء والمعراج).

References

Sacred natural sites